Luiz Henrique da Silveira (February 25, 1940 – May 10, 2015) was a Brazilian politician and lawyer. He represented Santa Catarina in the Federal Senate from 2011 to 2015. He was governor of Santa Catarina from 2003 to 2006 and 2007 to 2010. He was a member of the Brazilian Democratic Movement Party.

He died of a heart attack on May 10, 2015, in Itapema.

References

1940 births
2015 deaths
Governors of Santa Catarina (state)
Members of the Federal Senate (Brazil)
Ministers of Science and Technology of Brazil
Members of the Legislative Assembly of Santa Catarina
Brazilian Democratic Movement politicians
People from Blumenau